Juan Antonio Aballí Delgado (born March 10, 1965) is a Cuban sprint canoer who competed in the early 1990s. At the 1992 Summer Olympics in Barcelona, he finished ninth in the C-2 1000 m event while being eliminated in the semifinals of the C-2 500 m event.

References
Sports-Reference.com profile

1965 births
Canoeists at the 1992 Summer Olympics
Cuban male canoeists
Living people
Olympic canoeists of Cuba
Pan American Games medalists in canoeing
Pan American Games gold medalists for Cuba
Canoeists at the 1991 Pan American Games
Medalists at the 1991 Pan American Games
20th-century Cuban people